Mole verde ("green mole") is a type of mole of the cuisine of Mexico.

The main ingredients are pumpkin seeds and green chile, which bring color. Other ingredients may be green tomatoes, chile poblano, chile de árbol, tails onion, radish leaves, puñeton cilantro, lettuce, chard, parsley, epazote, onion, garlic, chicken broth and a few of bolillo or tortilla. Given that this is a traditional recipe, this varies depending on the region of the country where it is prepared.

The ingredients are chopped (except the pumpkin seeds) and ground. This preparation is gently fried in a pan with lard or vegetable oil. The seeds are ground with chicken broth or water and incorporated into the above, taking care of the amount to be added to achieve the desired consistency. This mole is served with chicken or pork and can be accompanied by red or white rice or beans.

References
Conacultura, La Cocina Familiar en el Estado de Jalisco, 2nda Edición, Océano, México, 2001.
http://www.epicurious.com/recipes/food/views/green-mole-108193

Mexican sauces